{{DISPLAYTITLE:C8H7NO2}}
The molecular formula C8H7NO2 (molar mass: 149.15 g/mol, exact mass: 149.0477 u) may refer to:

 NAPQI, also known as N-acetyl-p-benzoquinone imine or NABPQI
 β-Nitrostyrene

Molecular formulas